KNLT (95.5 FM, "95.5 The Pass") is a radio station licensed to serve the community of Palmer, Alaska. The station is owned by Joshua G. Fryfogle and airs an adult album alternative format.

The station was assigned the call sign KMVN by the Federal Communications Commission on April 23, 2012. The station changed its call sign to KNLT on September 18, 2012.

References

External links
 Official Website
 FCC Public Inspection File for KNLT
 

NLT (FM)
Radio stations established in 2012
2012 establishments in Alaska
Adult album alternative radio stations in the United States
Matanuska-Susitna Borough, Alaska